Meine Seele erhebt den Herren is Martin Luther's German translation of the Magnificat.

German Magnificat may also refer to:
 German Magnificat (Bach), Johann Sebastian Bach's cantata Meine Seel erhebt den Herren, BWV 10
 Magnificat in A minor (Hoffmann), BWV Anh. 21, once attributed to Bach, more recently attributed to Melchior Hoffmann
 Magnificat peregrini toni, the traditional setting of Luther's German Magnificat
 Meine Seele erhebt den Herren (Pachelbel), one of two organ preludes Johann Pachelbel composed on the Magnificat peregrini toni
 Meine Seele erhebt den Herren (Schütz), one of several German Magnificat settings by Heinrich Schütz
 Meine Seele rühmt und preist, BWV 189, on a German paraphrase of the Magnificat text, attribution to Bach doubtful, probably composed by Melchior Hoffmann